Sbap or SBAP may refer to:

Superman and Batman versus Aliens and Predator
SBAP (Soviet Air Forces), high-speed bomber regiments of the Soviet Air Forces
Sovereign Base Areas Police, Cyprus
Provinces of Siena, Grosseto and Arezzo Superintendent for Archaeology, Fine Arts and Landscape, (Soprintendenza Belle Arti e Paesaggio)